"Baby Shark" is a children's song associated with a dance involving hand movements that originated as a campfire song dating back to at least the 20th century. In 2016, "Baby Shark" became very popular when  Pinkfong, a South Korean entertainment company, released a version of the song with a YouTube music video that went viral across social media, online video, and radio. In January 2022, it became the first YouTube video to reach 10 billion views. In November 2020, Pinkfong's version became the most-viewed YouTube video of all time, with over 11 billion views as of July 2022.

Origins and early history

"Baby Shark" originated as a campfire song or chant. The original song dates back to at least the 20th century, potentially created by camp counselors inspired by the movie Jaws. In the chant, each member of a family of sharks is introduced, with campers using their hands to imitate the sharks' jaws. Different versions of the song have the sharks hunting fish, eating a sailor, or killing people who then go to heaven.

Various entities have copyrighted original videos and sound recordings of the song, and some have trademarked merchandise based on their versions. However, according to The New York Times, the underlying song and characters are believed to be in the public domain.

Alemuel version
A dance version of "Baby Shark" was popularized in the 2007 YouTube video "Kleiner Hai" (German for Little Shark) published by Alexandra Müller, also known by her stage name Alemuel. This version is set to the theme of Jaws and tells the story of a baby shark who grows up and eats a swimmer. The video quickly gained popularity and led to EMI offering  a record deal. The single peaked at 25th in the German charts and at 21 in the Austrian charts. The German version of the song remains popular among German youth groups, and multiple variations, also in different dialects of German, have been published.

Johnny Only version
Johnny Only, a children's entertainer based in Upstate New York, was a DJ at a kids camp and the counselors would regularly perform the song with their campers. He saw how engaged and animated the campers were when "Baby Shark" was performed, so when he became a full-time children's entertainer, he released his own version. This version was released in 2011, five years before the Pinkfong version of "Baby Shark" became a global phenomenon.

Pinkfong version
"Baby Shark" was greatly popularized by a version of the song produced by Pinkfong, an education brand owned by South Korean entertainment company SmartStudy. The original music video for "Baby Shark" without the child actors was uploaded on November 26, 2015. All videos related to Pinkfong's song had garnered around 5 billion views by January 2020. The most popular of these videos, "Baby Shark Dance", was uploaded on June 17, 2016, and went viral starting in 2017. On November 2, 2020, over four years after it was uploaded, it became the most-viewed YouTube video of all time after surpassing Luis Fonsi's "Despacito" with 7.04 billion views. On December 21, 2020, it became the first YouTube video to surpass 7.5 billion views, the approximate population of the world. It is the first most-viewed video to mention its status as such in the title.

This version of the song was performed by then-10-year-old Korean-American singer Hope Segoine. The music video featured two child actors, one of whom is child actress Elaine Johnston, a 9-year-old New Zealander of Korean-Scottish descent.

The song starts with bars from Antonín Dvořák's Symphony No. 9, which sounds similar to music from the film Jaws. "Baby Shark" features a family of sharks which hunt a school of fish which escape to safety. It became a viral video in Indonesia in 2017, and throughout the year it spread to many other Asian countries, particularly those in Southeast Asia. The related mobile app was among the top 10 most downloaded in the family apps category in South Korea, Bangladesh, Singapore, Hong Kong and Indonesia in 2017.

"Baby Shark Dance" has received over 12 billion views worldwide(12.38 billion), over 38 million likes(39.43 million), and around 6.08M daily views and 182M monthly views making it the most-viewed video on YouTube. Due to a 2013 change that the Billboard Hot 100 music charts made to account for online viewership of YouTube videos, "Baby Shark" broke into the Billboard Hot 100 at number 32 during the week of January 7, 2019.

Due to its popularity, this version of the song has spurred an online dance craze which is sometimes referred to as the Baby Shark Challenge. It has been cited as "the next big thing after the domination of Gangnam Style". K-pop groups including Blackpink and Red Velvet have been credited with further spreading the viral song through their coverage of the song and dance, specifically on their featured TV shows and concerts. The song began to go viral in the Western world in August 2018.

In 2019, it was announced that Baby Shark would be adapted into Baby Shark's Big Show!, an animated television series aimed at preschoolers. SmartStudy (the company that owns the Pinkfong brand) partnered with US cable network Nickelodeon, which premiered the show in the United States in December 2020. In South Korea, the Educational Broadcasting System (EBS) airs the cartoon.

Controversies
While the English version simply lists the members of the shark family, the Korean version says Mommy Shark is "pretty", Daddy Shark is "strong", Grandma Shark is "kind", and Grandpa Shark is "cool". In January 2018, the South Korean newspaper Kyunghyang Shinmun published a front-page editorial condemning these lyrics as sexist.

In May 2018, the Liberty Korea Party started using "Baby Shark" to promote its candidates, prompting SmartStudy to threaten legal action over copyright infringement. Prior to this, the Liberty Korea Party had contacted American children's entertainer Johnny Wright, also known as Johnny Only, to inquire about permission, as he had published a similar version in 2011. He had heard a version of "Baby Shark" 20 years earlier, and decided to make a children's version by removing any violent imagery from the song, instead focusing on the family. As matters stand in late 2022, neither SmartStudy nor Johnny Only have succeeded in enforcing copyright on either version; SmartStudy prevailed in Johnny Only's lawsuit attempting to enforce his copyright, after a South Korean court ruling held that children's songs handed down via the oral tradition are not copyrightable. 

In July 2019, officials in West Palm Beach, Florida, were criticized for playing a continuous loop of "Baby Shark" throughout the night outside the Waterfront Lake Pavilion as a way of deterring vagrants.

In October 2020, two former detention officers and a supervisor at an Oklahoma County jail were charged with counts of misdemeanor cruelty to a prisoner and conspiracy for forcing inmates to listen to the song on a loop at loud volumes while standing and handcuffed for an extended period of time.

Legacy
In July 2019, Kellogg's announced that it had entered a partnership with Pinkfong to introduce a new Baby Shark cereal, a berry-flavored variant of Froot Loops with marshmallows added. It was first available at Sam's Club stores on August 17, and at Walmart in late September.

In October 2019, a 75-minute stage musical based on the Pinkfong song and characters, titled Baby Shark Live, made its debut at Spartanburg Memorial Auditorium in Spartanburg, South Carolina. By this time, Pinkfong was also marketing a wide variety of merchandise based on their song and video, including clothing, bedding, toys and fishing tackle.

"Baby Shark" has appeared in media like films and video games. In 2019 and 2020, the song was featured in The Angry Birds Movie 2 and Rubber and was playable in Just Dance 2020. The following year, Pinkfong partnered with Bushiroad to include "Baby Shark" as a playable track in the English server of BanG Dream! Girls Band Party! from March 27 to April 17.

In March 2020, Pinkfong released a new interactive version of the song that encourages children to properly wash their hands during the COVID-19 pandemic.

In April 2022 and May 2022 Shopee used the melody of Baby Shark with modified lyrics in its advertisements in Poland. However, many Poles consider the advertisements as annoying, due to a high incidence of broadcasting across the television and radio.

On 23 May 2022, it was reported that a promotional video for Singapore's tourism sector in the form of a collaboration between Pinkfong and the Singapore Tourism Board was made and uploaded on YouTube. The video featured characters from Baby Shark and the Merli, a Singaporean mascot.

Charts

Weekly charts

Year-end charts

Certifications

Baby Shark duet

Weekly charts

Other performances
In September 2018, Ellen DeGeneres released her own version of the song on The Ellen DeGeneres Show, and James Corden performed a version on The Late Late Show with James Corden. The song was performed on The X Factor in early December 2018 because it was requested by Simon Cowell's four-year-old son Eric.

Yvie Oddly, a Drag queen and contestant on RuPaul's Drag Race, adapted the song for live lip-syncing performances, including a choreography that draws inspiration from voguing.

Professional baseball player Gerardo Parra of the Washington Nationals, having discovered the song through his young daughter, adopted it as his walk-up music to energize the flagging team on June 19, 2019. The theme became popular among both teammates and fans, who used the shark clap whenever the Nationals got a hit, and eventually, at every Parra at-bat; fans also began wearing shark costumes to the stadium. A stuffed baby shark was seen attached to the dugout railing during the 2019 National League Championship Series, which the Nationals won over the St. Louis Cardinals. The craze culminated with the Nationals defeating the Houston Astros in seven games to win the 2019 World Series; the connection was such that the Marine Band performed the song during the team's celebratory visit to the White House.

Darts player Mikuru Suzuki has used the song as her entrance music.

The song has also been performed by anti-government protesters in Lebanon during the 2019–20 Lebanese protests.

Popular Australian children's music band The Wiggles released a version of the song in March 2020.

In the American comedy-drama television series Ted Lasso, fictional soccer player Jamie Tartt (played by English actor Phil Dunster) uses the tune of the song as his goal celebration anthem, in which the words "Baby Shark" are replaced with his name.

Pomplamoose released an electro funk version on April 1, 2021.

In Southeast Asia, the song was used in an online shopping platform called Shopee, with different versions and renditions. It was first spotted in 2018 with Filipina actress Anne Curtis as endorser. More recently, the jingle to the tune of "Baby Shark" was used when Jackie Chan became international brand ambassador.

Other media
In November 2019, an officially licensed children's book based on the Pinkfong characters was being marketed by HarperCollins, while five unlicensed children's books offered by Scholastic Corporation had sold over one million copies.

In June 2020, Pinkfong announced the television series Baby Shark's Big Show!, which premiered on Educational Broadcasting System (EBS) in South Korea and Nickelodeon in the United States in December 2020. On July 20, 2021, the series was renewed for a second season, and a feature film based on the series is currently in development.

See also
List of viral music videos
List of most-viewed YouTube videos
List of most-liked YouTube videos

References

External links

 
 Baby Shark episode of the Slate podcast Decoder Ring

German children's songs
Fictional sharks
German nursery rhymes
Songs about fish
Novelty songs
2007 songs
2015 songs
English-language South Korean songs
South Korean children's entertainment
Viral videos
2007 YouTube videos
2015 YouTube videos
Internet memes introduced in the 2010s
Washington Nationals
2010s fads and trends
Internet memes introduced in 2016
Novelty and fad dances
Korean children's songs
Korean nursery rhymes